"Power to All Our Friends" is a song by Cliff Richard which was chosen as the  entry to the Eurovision Song Contest 1973, by a postal vote which was decided by BBC viewers after Richard performed six contending songs on A Song For Europe, featured on Cilla Black's BBC1 Saturday evening show Cilla. The runner-up song was "Come Back Billie Jo", written by Mitch Murray and Tony Macaulay, which was included as the B-side on the single. "Power to All Our Friends" came third in the Eurovision Song Contest.

It was released as a single in 1973 and reached number 4 in the UK Singles Chart and became an international hit reaching number one in numerous countries.
 

Track listing
7": EMI / EMI 2012
 "Power to All Our Friends" – 3:01
 "Come Back Billie Jo" – 2:37

7": EMI / 5C 006-05312 (Netherlands)
 "Power to All Our Friends" – 3:01
 "The Days of Love" – 2:57

Personnel
 Cliff Richard – vocals
 Terry Britten – guitar
 Kevin Peek – guitar
 Alan Tarney – bass guitar
 Trevor Spencer – drums
 Barrie Guard – percussion

Charts

Cover versions
 Séverine – "Il faut chanter la vie" (French version)
 Peter Holm – "Il faut chanter la vie" (French version)
 Peter Holm – "Vänner som du och ja'" (Swedish version)
 Cliff Richard – "Gut, dass es Freunde gibt" (German version)
 Frank Schöbel – "Gut, dass es Freunde gibt" (German version)
 Los Sirex – "Todo el poder a los amigos " (Spanish version)
 Ricchi e Poveri – "1+2=3" (Italian version)
  – "" (Greek version)

References

1973 singles
Cliff Richard songs
Eurovision songs of 1973
Eurovision songs of the United Kingdom
Songs written by Guy Fletcher (songwriter)
Songs written by Doug Flett
Dutch Top 40 number-one singles
Number-one singles in Norway
Number-one singles in Sweden
EMI Records singles
1973 songs